Ronan Pallier is a Paralympian athlete from France competing mainly in category F12 long jump and T12 sprint events.

Pallier has competed in three Paralympics, firstly in Athens in 2004 where he competed in the T13 100m, F13 long jump and was part of the French T11-13 4 × 100 m team.  In Beijing in 2008 he made a second more successful appearance, after the F12 long jump he won a bronze medal as part of the French team in the T11-13 4 × 100 m relay. At the 2020 Tokyo Paralympics he competed in the T11 long jump, at the age of 50.

External links
 
 

Paralympic athletes of France
Athletes (track and field) at the 2004 Summer Paralympics
Athletes (track and field) at the 2008 Summer Paralympics
Athletes (track and field) at the 2020 Summer Paralympics
Paralympic bronze medalists for France
Living people
French male sprinters
French male long jumpers
Year of birth missing (living people)
Medalists at the 2008 Summer Paralympics
Medalists at the 2020 Summer Paralympics
Paralympic medalists in athletics (track and field)
20th-century French people
21st-century French people